Skerrett is a surname. Notable people with the surname include:

Charles Skerrett KCMG, KC (1863–1929), the fifth Chief Justice of New Zealand from 1926 to 1929
James Skerrett (fl. 1513 – 1532), Mayor of Galway
John Skerrett (Augustinian) (c. 1630 – 1688) Galway-born preacher and Missionary
John Skerrett (mayor), 7th Mayor of Galway, 1491–1492
John Byrne Skerrett (c. 1778 – 1814), British soldier who fought in the Spanish War of Independence
Joseph Skerrett, American literary critic and professor of English at the University of Massachusetts Amherst
Joseph S. Skerrett (1833–1897), American admiral
Kelvin Skerrett (born 1966), English rugby league footballer
Marianne Skerrett (1793–1887), the lady's maid of queen Victoria
Michael Skerrett (died 1785), Irish clergyman of the Roman Catholic Church
Nicholas Skerrett (died 1583), Galway-born Archbishop of Tuam, 1580–83
Trevor Skerrett, English  rugby league footballer

References
 Henry, William, Role of Honour: The Mayors of Galway City 1485–2001, Galway, 2002. OCLC 51023721 ASIN B003NECRYW
 Martyn, Adrian, The Tribes of Galway:1124–1642, Galway, 2016.